The 2016 Detroit Lions season was the franchise's 87th season in the National Football League (NFL), their 83rd as the Detroit Lions, and their third under head coach Jim Caldwell. This for first time since 2006 when Calvin Johnson was not on the opening day roster. On January 8, 2016, the Lions hired Bob Quinn as general manager. This was also the first season in over 40 years in which the Lions had an official cheerleading squad. The Lions improved upon their 7–9 record from 2015, and clinched a playoff spot for the first time since 2014—the Lions finished tied with the Tampa Bay Buccaneers for the last NFC playoff spot, but won the tiebreaker based on their record against common opponents. However, the Lions were defeated by the Seattle Seahawks in the Wild Card Round and extended their playoff losing streak to nine games.

Offseason

Re-signings

Arrivals

Departures

Trades
On May 9, the Lions traded a conditional seventh-round draft pick in the 2017 NFL draft to the New England Patriots in exchange for linebacker Jon Bostic.
On August 29, the Lions traded wide receiver Jeremy Kerley to the San Francisco 49ers in exchange for offensive guard Brandon Thomas.
On October 25, the Lions traded linebacker Kyle Van Noy and a seventh-round draft pick in the 2017 NFL draft to the New England Patriots, in exchange for a sixth-round draft pick in 2017.

Draft

Notes
 The Lions traded their original third-round selection (number 77 overall) to the Philadelphia Eagles in exchange for the Eagles' 2015 fourth-round selection (number 111 overall).
 The Lions acquired an additional fifth-round selection (number 169 overall) as part of a trade that sent their 2015 first-round selection to the Denver Broncos.
 The Lions acquired an additional sixth-round selection (number 202 overall) in a trade that sent cornerback Mohammed Seisay to the Seattle Seahawks.

Final roster

Schedule

Preseason

Regular season

Note: Intra-division opponents are in bold text.

Postseason

Game summaries

Regular season

Week 1: at Indianapolis Colts

The Lions opened the regular season on the road against the Indianapolis Colts, and came away with a close victory. The Lions jumped out to a 14–0 lead before Indianapolis got on the board. Theo Riddick had a 21-yard touchdown run on the Lions' opening drive, and rookie running back Dwayne Washington scored on a 1-yard run early in the second quarter. The Colts got on the board with a 50-yard Adam Vinatieri field goal, but the Lions went up 21–3 on its next possession when Matthew Stafford hit Eric Ebron for a six-yard touchdown pass. Indianapolis closed to 21–10 near the end of the first half after Andrew Luck tossed a two-yard touchdown pass to Donte Moncrief. The Colts got within a field goal early in the third quarter with a 19-yard scoring strike from Luck to Dwayne Allen and a successful 2-point conversion. On Detroit's next drive, Stafford connected with Ameer Abdullah on an 11-yard touchdown pass to put his team back up, 28–18. The Colts scored the next ten points early in the fourth quarter on a 40-yard Vinatieri field goal and a 16-yard scoring pass from Luck to Jack Doyle, knotting the game at 28. The Lions regained the lead on a 13-yard touchdown pass from Stafford to Riddick, but Matt Prater missed the extra point. That allowed Indianapolis to take a 35–34 lead on its next possession, when Luck again connected with Doyle, this time on a six-yard touchdown pass. Detroit got the ball back with 37 seconds left in the game, and on three plays moved into range for Matt Prater's go-ahead 43-yard field goal with four seconds on the clock. The Lions earned a safety on the final play of the game when the Colts were called for an illegal forward pass in the end zone, making the final score 39–35. This was the first time the Lions defeated the Colts since 1997.

Week 2: vs. Tennessee Titans

For their home opener, the Lions hosted the Tennessee Titans. The Lions had led for most of the game, accumulating 12 points in the first half with an end zone tackle of DeMarco Murray by Devin Taylor for a safety, a 24-yard touchdown catch by Anquan Boldin from Matthew Stafford, and a 42-yard Matt Prater field goal, while holding the Titans to only a 46-yard field goal by Ryan Succop before the break. Detroit lost steam after intermission and only managed to score a single 27-yard Prater field goal in the third quarter. After Tennessee gained a 16–15 lead late in the fourth quarter on touchdown passes from Marcus Mariota to Delanie Walker and Andre Johnson, from 30 and nine-yards respectively, an attempted Detroit comeback failed when Matthew Stafford was picked off by Perrish Cox in the closing seconds, giving the Lions their first loss of the season. The game was marred by 29 penalties, 17 on the Lions. Detroit had three touchdowns (two on the same drive) called back due to penalties.

Week 3: at Green Bay Packers

The Lions traveled west in week 3 to play their division rival the Green Bay Packers. The Packers got on the board first with a 14-yard touchdown pass from Aaron Rodgers to Davante Adams. The Lions responded with a 42-yard field goal from Matt Prater. Green Bay accumulated a big lead with two touchdown catches by Jordy Nelson for eight and later 17 yards, one by Richard Rodgers II from two-yards, as well as a 36-yard field goal from Mason Crosby. Detroit made the halftime score 31–10 after Marvin Jones caught a 17-yard touchdown catch from Matthew Stafford. After the break, the Lions attempted a comeback with touchdown catches by Anquan Boldin and Marvin Jones, from two and 45-yards respectively, as well a 50-yard Prater field goal. Despite only allowing a 46-yard Packers field goal in the second half, the Lions came up short, losing  27–34.

Week 4: at Chicago Bears

In week 4, the Lions had their second consecutive divisional road game when they visited the Chicago Bears. The Bears got on the board first with a four-yard touchdown pass from Brian Hoyer to Eddie Royal. The Lions responded with a 50-yard field goal from Matt Prater, which made the score 7–3 in favor of the Bears at half-time. The Lions opened the scoring in the second half with a 21-yard field goal from Matt Prater. The Bears responded with a six-yard touchdown pass from Hoyer to Zach Miller. The Bears extended their lead in the fourth quarter with a 25-yard field goal from Connor Barth. The Lions responded with an 85-yard punt return by Andre Roberts, and a two-point conversion pass from Matthew Stafford to Golden Tate. Despite the attempted comeback, the Lions came up short, losing 14–17.

Week 5: vs. Philadelphia Eagles

In week 5, the Lions hosted the Philadelphia Eagles to start a three-game home stand. The Lions took a 14–0 lead in the first quarter with a pair of touchdown catches by Theo Riddick, from one and 17 yards out respectively. The Eagles responded in the second quarter with a one-yard touchdown pass from Carson Wentz to Ryan Mathews, cutting the Lions lead to seven points. The Lions added to their lead with a one-yard touchdown pass from Stafford to Marvin Jones. The Eagles responded with a 50-yard field goal from Caleb Sturgis, which made the score 21–10 in favor of the Lions at halftime. The Eagles scored 10 points in the third quarter via a one-yard touchdown pass from Wentz to Josh Huff, and a 33-yard field goal from Sturgis, cutting the Lions lead to one point. The Eagles took their first lead of the game, going up 23–21 in the fourth quarter on a 49-yard field goal from Sturgis. At the 2:34 mark of the final quarter, Darius Slay forced a Ryan Mathews fumble, which the Lions recovered inside Eagles territory. This was Philadelphia's first turnover of the 2016 season. The Lions got into range for a 29-yard Matt Prater field goal, making the score 24–23 with 1:28 left. Darius Slay intercepted a Wentz pass on the Eagles' next play from scrimmage, sealing the Lions victory and giving the Eagles their first loss of the season.

Week 6: vs. Los Angeles Rams

In week 6, the Lions hosted the Los Angeles Rams. The score seesawed the entire game. The Lions scored first with a seven-yard touchdown pass from Matthew Stafford to Marvin Jones. The Rams tied it up with a 20-yard touchdown pass from Case Keenum to Kenny Britt, and took the lead in the second quarter with a one-yard touchdown run by Keenum. The Lions tied it back up with a two-yard touchdown catch by Andre Roberts on fourth down, and stopped the Rams from taking the lead with a goal line stand as time expired in the second quarter, keeping the score tied 14–14 at halftime. After the break, the Lions took the lead back with a four-yard touchdown catch by Anquan Boldin, but the Rams tied it back up with a 15-yard catch by Lance Kendricks. Los Angeles then retook the lead in the fourth quarter with a nine-yard catch from Britt, but Detroit tied it up again on a 23-yard TD catch by Golden Tate. The Lions took the lead for good with a 34-yard field goal by Matt Prater at the 1:29 mark of the final quarter. Detroit prevented the Rams from getting into range for a game-tying field goal when Rafael Bush intercepted a Keenum pass with just over a minute to play, giving the Lions a 31–28 win and improving their record to 3–3. Golden Tate tallied a career-high 165 yards on eight receptions.

The Lions celebrated the 25th anniversary of their 1991 NFC Central Championship with an on-field reunion of its players at halftime.

Week 7: vs. Washington Redskins

In week 7, the Lions hosted the Washington Redskins. After a scoreless first quarter, each team scored only a field goal in the second quarter: first Detroit's Matt Prater from 43 yards, then Washington's Dustin Hopkins from 38 yards, to tie the game at three points apiece at halftime. The only score of the third quarter was a one-yard touchdown run by the Lions' Zach Zenner. The Lions extended their lead in the fourth quarter via a 27-yard field goal from Prater. The Redskins responded with 14 consecutive points on a pair of touchdowns, first with a one-yard pass from Kirk Cousins to Robert Kelley, and next on a 19-yard run by Cousins. This give the Redskins their first lead of the game, 17–13, with just over a minute to go. The Lions took the lead back on the next drive, when Matthew Stafford hit Anquan Boldin for an 18-yard TD with 16 seconds left, to win the game, 20–17.

Week 8: at Houston Texans

In week 8, the Lions visited the Houston Texans. After a scoreless first quarter, the Texans took an early lead that they never relinquished with a pair of touchdowns. First, Brock Osweiler connected with C. J. Fiedorowicz on a six-yard touchdown pass, then Lamar Miller scored on a one-yard run. The Lions' only score of the first half was a 47-yard field goal from Matt Prater, making the halftime score 14–3. The only score of the third quarter was a 33-yard field goal from Houston's Nick Novak.  Detroit responded with a one-yard touchdown catch by Theo Riddick in the fourth quarter, but the Texans went back up by 10 points after a 36-yard Novak field goal. The Lions scored the final points of the game with a 34-yard field goal. Despite the attempted late game comeback, Detroit came up short, losing 20–13 and snapping their three-game winning streak.

Week 9: at Minnesota Vikings

In week 9, the Lions visited their division rival the Minnesota Vikings. The Lions opened the scoring in the first quarter via a 47-yard field goal from Matt Prater. The Vikings responded in the second quarter via a 33-yard field goal from Blair Walsh. Detroit came back with a one-yard touchdown pass from Stafford to Boldin, giving them a 10–3 lead at halftime. In the third quarter, the Vikings reduced the Lions lead to one point via a one-yard touchdown pass from Sam Bradford to Kyle Rudolph, but Walsh missed the extra point kick. The Lions extended their lead in the fourth quarter via a 53-yard field goal from Prater. Minnesota took a three-point lead via a one-yard touchdown run from Rhett Ellison with 23 seconds left in the game. Detroit responded with a 58-yard field goal from Prater to tie the score at 16 as time expired, forcing overtime. In the extra session, Detroit scored on its opening possession via a 28-yard touchdown pass from Stafford to Tate, where Tate stiff-armed safety Harrison Smith and then flipped into the end-zone, earning a 22–16 win.

Week 11: vs. Jacksonville Jaguars

In week 11 following their bye-week, the Lions hosted the Jacksonville Jaguars. The Jaguars opened the scoring in the first quarter via a 27-yard field goal from Jason Myers. The Lions' first score came in the second quarter on a 55-yard punt return from Andre Roberts, but the extra point try by Matt Prater was partially blocked and failed. The Jaguars responded with a three-yard touchdown pass from Blake Bortles to Allen Robinson, but the conversion attempt by Myers also failed. The Lions then scored on a 27-yard field goal from Matt Prater, which tied the score at 9–9 at halftime. The Lions took the lead in the third quarter via a 39-yard interception return from Rafael Bush. The Jaguars responded with 10 points in the third quarter via a 52-yard field goal from Myers, and a three-yard touchdown pass from Bortles to Marqise Lee, giving them a 19–16 lead. The Lions, trailing for the ninth straight game when entering the fourth quarter, would score the final 10 points of the game. The Lions offense scored its first and only touchdown on a one-yard run from Eric Ebron, and Matt Prater added a 43-yard field goal with 22 seconds left in the game. On the final drive for the Jaguars, Tavon Wilson intercepted a pass from Bortles, sealing the Lions 26–19 victory.

The Lions became the first team in NFL history to have its first ten games of a season all decided by seven or fewer points.

Week 12: vs. Minnesota Vikings
Thanksgiving Day game

For their annual Thanksgiving Day game, the Lions hosted a rematch with division rival the Minnesota Vikings, with both teams coming into the game at 6–4 and the winner gaining first place in the NFC North. The Lions opened the scoring in the first quarter via a two-yard touchdown pass from Matthew Stafford to Anquan Boldin. The Vikings responded with a five-yard touchdown run from Matt Asiata. In the second quarter, the Lions recorded a 29-yard field goal from Matt Prater, which made the score 10–7 in favor of the Lions at halftime. The Vikings again tied the score in the third quarter via a 30-yard field goal from Kai Forbath, and took their first lead of the game in the fourth quarter via a 28-yard field goal from Forbath. The Lions responded with a 48-yard field goal from Prater to tie the game. With 38 seconds left in the fourth quarter, Darius Slay intercepted a pass from Sam Bradford. Two plays later, Prater recorded a 40-yard field goal as time expired, giving the Lions a 16–13 win.

The Lions have trailed in the fourth quarter of every game this season, and tied an NFL record for the most fourth quarter comeback wins in a season with seven, set by the 2009 Indianapolis Colts. The Lions extended their own NFL record of games to start a season being decided by seven points or fewer, now standing at eleven.

Week 13: at New Orleans Saints

After their Thanksgiving win, the Lions traveled south to play the New Orleans Saints. The Lions opened the scoring in the first quarter via a 27-yard field goal from Matt Prater. Detroit extended their lead in the second quarter via a one-yard touchdown pass from Matthew Stafford to Theo Riddick. The Saints reduced the Lions lead to seven points via a 40-yard field goal from Wil Lutz. The two teams exchanged field goals, one from Prater from 29 yards, and one from Lutz from 32 yards, making the score 13–6 in favor of the Lions at halftime. The Lions added two field goals from Prater in the third quarter, from 32 yards and 27 yards out, extending their lead to 19–6. The Saints opened the scoring in the fourth quarter with a one-yard touchdown run from John Kuhn. The Lions responded on the next drive with a 66-yard touchdown pass from Stafford to Golden Tate, which was followed by a failed two-point conversion. Matt Prater finished the scoring with a 52-yard field goal, giving the Lions a 28–13 win.

This marked the first game all year in which the Lions never trailed in the fourth quarter, and their first game of 2016 to be decided by more than seven points. The Lions defense held Saints quarterback Drew Brees without a touchdown pass, ending a streak of 60 straight home games in which Brees threw for at least one touchdown. Further, the Lions won a road game following their Thanksgiving Day game for the first time since 1974, ending a streak of 22 losses in such games. In one stretch during the first half, Matthew Stafford completed 14 consecutive passes, a Lions franchise record.

Week 14: vs. Chicago Bears

In week 14, the Lions returned home for a rematch with division rival the Chicago Bears, who defeated the Lions in Chicago in week 4. The Bears opened the scoring in the first quarter via a 38-yard field goal from Connor Barth. The Lions responded with 10 points in the second quarter via a 29-yard field goal from Matt Prater, and a 16-yard touchdown pass from Matthew Stafford to Anquan Boldin, which made the score 10–3 in favor of the Lions at half-time. The Lions extended their lead in the third quarter via a 54-yard field goal from Prater. The Bears reduced the Lions lead to three points via a 31-yard touchdown pass from Matt Barkley to Cameron Meredith. The Bears regained the lead in the fourth quarter via a 24-yard interception return from Cre'Von LeBlanc. The Lions responded with a seven-yard touchdown run from Stafford with 3:17 left in the game, giving the Lions a 20–17 lead they held onto for the win, and breaking an NFL record with 8 comebacks in a single season.

With the win, the Lions have won five games in a row for the first time since 2011. The Lions have also held opponents to 20 points or fewer in seven straight games, their longest such streak since 1961.

Week 15: at New York Giants

In week 15, the Lions traveled east to play the New York Giants. The Giants opened the scoring in the first quarter via a six-yard touchdown pass from Eli Manning to Sterling Shepard. The two teams exchanged field goals in the second quarter, one from Matt Prater from 48 yards, and one from Robbie Gould from 47 yards, making the score 10–3 in favor of the Giants at halftime. The Lions reduced the lead to four points in the third quarter via a 33-yard field goal from Prater. The Giants extended their lead in fourth quarter with a four-yard touchdown pass from Manning to Odell Beckham Jr. The Lions' attempted comeback failed when Matthew Stafford was picked off by Dominique Rodgers-Cromartie in the end-zone for a touchback with 2:09 left in the game, losing 17–6, and snapping their five-game winning streak.

Week 16: at Dallas Cowboys

In week 16, the Lions flew southwest to play the Dallas Cowboys on Monday Night Football. The Cowboys opened the scoring in the first quarter via a 21-yard touchdown pass from Dak Prescott to Brice Butler. The Lions responded with a 7-yard touchdown run from Zach Zenner. The Cowboys regained the lead via a 55-yard touchdown run from Ezekiel Elliott. The Lions scored 14 points in the second quarter via a 1-yard touchdown run from Matthew Stafford and a 5-yard run from Zenner, to take their first lead of the game. The Cowboys responded with a 25-yard touchdown pass from Prescott to Dez Bryant, which tied the score 21–21 at halftime. The Cowboys scored 21 unanswered points in the second half, via a 1-yard touchdown run from Elliott and a 10-yard touchdown pass from Bryant to Jason Witten in the third quarter, and a 19-yard touchdown pass from Prescott to Bryant in the fourth quarter, making the final score 42–21.

The Lions' streak of holding opponents to 20 points or fewer was ended at eight consecutive games.

Week 17: vs. Green Bay Packers

To finish the regular season, the Lions hosted a rematch with division rival the Green Bay Packers on Sunday Night Football, their second consecutive nationally televised, prime-time game. After a scoreless first quarter, the Packers opened the scoring in the second quarter via a seven-yard touchdown pass from Aaron Rodgers to Aaron Ripkowski. The Lions responded with 14 points via a one-yard touchdown run from Zach Zenner and a three-yard touchdown pass from Matthew Stafford to Golden Tate. The Packers reduced the Lions lead to four points via a 53-yard field goal from Mason Crosby, which made the score 14–10 in favor of the Lions at half-time. The Packers regained the lead in the third quarter via a three-yard touchdown pass from Rodgers to Davante Adams, and increased it in the fourth quarter via a 10-yard touchdown pass from Rodgers to Geronimo Allison, and a nine-yard touchdown pass from Rodgers to Adams. The Lions responded with a 54-yard field goal from Matt Prater and a 35-yard touchdown pass from Stafford to Anquan Boldin but came up short, losing 24–31. With the loss, Green Bay won the NFC North division title, but Detroit won a wildcard spot, thanks to Washington's loss to the Giants earlier in the day.

Postseason

NFC Wild Card Playoffs: at (3) Seattle Seahawks

After a scoreless first quarter, the Seahawks opened the scoring in the second quarter via a two-yard touchdown pass from Russell Wilson to Paul Richardson. The Seahawks extended their lead via a 43-yard field goal from Steven Hauschka. The Lions responded with a 51-yard field goal from Matt Prater, which made the score 10–3 in favor of the Seahawks at half-time. The Lions reduced the Seahawks' lead to four points in the third quarter via a 53-yard field goal from Prater. The Seahawks scored 16 points in the fourth quarter via a 27-yard field goal from Hauschka, a four-yard touchdown run from Thomas Rawls, and a 13-yard touchdown pass from Wilson to Doug Baldwin, making the final score 26–6 in favor of Seattle, and ending the Lions' season. The loss marked the Lions' ninth consecutive playoff game without a win, the longest streak in NFL history.

Standings

Division

Conference

Staff

References

External links
 

Detroit
Detroit Lions seasons
Detroit Lions